Roosevelt is a neighborhood in north Seattle, Washington. Its main thoroughfare, originally 10th Avenue, was renamed Roosevelt Way upon Theodore Roosevelt's death in 1919. The neighborhood received the name as the result of a Community Club contest held eight years later, in 1927.

Roosevelt's principal and minor arterials are the one-way pair Roosevelt Way (southbound) and 12th Avenue NE (northbound), Lake City Way (SR 522) and 15th Avenue NE, and NE 65th and 75th Streets.  City streets are laid out and designated in a pattern; see street layout of Seattle, directionals.

The boundaries of the neighborhood are Interstate 5 to the west, beyond which lies Green Lake; NE Ravenna Boulevard and NE 60th Street to the south, beyond which is the University District; 15th Avenue NE to the east, beyond which is Ravenna; and Lake City Way (SR 522) to the north, beyond which lies Maple Leaf.

Schools
The Roosevelt district is also home to Roosevelt High School (RHS, opened 1922), one of the older schools in the Seattle School District. Like the street, it is named after Teddy, not Franklin D. Roosevelt.  For many years, Roosevelt High School and Garfield High School juggled the lead in the school district in many academic and sports fields. Alumni include Mark Pattison, who played football for the University of Washington Huskies and was drafted in the seventh round in 1985 by the Oakland Raiders of the NFL, actress Rose McGowan,(also attended Nova) and Nobel laureate scientists Linda B. Buck and Robert E. Lucas Jr.

Shops
Although primarily a residential neighborhood, the Roosevelt district had a Sears department store from 1928 to 1980.  After its closure, the land was redeveloped as Roosevelt Square, which now features all natural supermarket Whole Foods Market, local and family-owned pharmacy Bartell Drugs (chain established 1890), a Mud Bay pet store and a Starbucks among other businesses. A block beyond Roosevelt Way to the west is the longest-established vegetarian restaurant in Seattle, independent Sunlight Cafe, nearly as old (1978) as Starbucks.  Numerous other small businesses still line 65th Street and Roosevelt Way. Teddy's is a multi-generational, multi-subculture popular biker bar. Roosevelt Way from 62nd Street north to 64th was somewhat of an "audio row", having featured a concentration of stores selling high-end audio and video systems and components. Today, only two such stores remain.

Parks 

The neighborhood includes two parks: Cowen Park, in the southeast corner (contiguous with the larger Ravenna Park of Ravenna); and Froula Playground, in the northeast corner, adjacent to the Green Lake Reservoir. The source of Ravenna Creek has been reduced to Cowen Park; since completion of partial daylighting in 2006, the creek has been reconnected to Lake Washington.

Recent projects
The underground Roosevelt Link light rail station located at NE 65th St and 12th Ave NE opened for service on October 2, 2021, which connects Roosevelt to downtown Seattle as well as the Northgate neighborhood to the north.

See also 
 Neighborhoods of Ravenna Creek

Notes and references

External links 
Roosevelt Neighborhood Association official website
Seattle City Clerk's Neighborhood Map Atlas — Roosevelt

Bibliography 
 
 
   Economics > Laureates > Robert E. Lucas.
   PDF at "the company. What we are all about"
   Howe > Restaurants > Vegetarian.
   From 
 
   High-Resolution Version, PDF format, 16.1 MB  Medium-Resolution Version, PDF format, 1.45 MB  12 January 2004.  Low-Resolution Version, PDF format, 825 KB  12 January 2004.  "Planned Arterials Map Legend Definitions", PDF format.  12 January 2004. The high resolution version is good for printing, 11 x 17. The low and medium resolution versions are good for quicker online viewing. [Source: "Street Classification Maps, Note on Accessing These PDF Files"]
   "NN-1030S", "NN-1040S".jpg dated 17 June 2002
 
 
 
 
 Sound Transit webpage on future light rail station in Roosevelt

Further reading 

   "with additions by Sunny Walter and local Audubon chapters."  Viewing locations only; the book has walks, hikes, wildlife, and natural wonders.  Walter excerpted from
   See "Northeast Seattle" section, bullet points "Meadowbrook", "Paramount Park Open Space", "North Seattle Community College Wetlands", and "Sunny Walter – Twin Ponds".